Major General Akhtar Hussain Malik  (1910s – 22 August 1969) was a Pakistani senior army officer, and a widely decorated war hero of the Pakistan Army due to his leadership and command during the Indo-Pakistani War of 1965.

Early years 
Akhtar Hussain Malik was born in the small village of Pandori, Jalandhar, British India (present-day Punjab, India). He was the son of Malik Ghulam Nabi, the headmaster at a local school. Due to the scarcity of good educational institutions in the vicinity of his village at the time, his father made an effort to send him to a school miles away, because of which he and his friends would have to walk for hours every day. By the time he graduated from college, World War II had already broken out and Malik enlisted as a sepoy in the British Indian Army. His personal discipline, educational level and intelligence were soon noticed by the higher command and he was sent to the Indian Military Academy in Dehradun for officer training and additional education. Malik graduated and was commissioned as a Second Lieutenant in the special list on 1 June 1941.

He was admitted to the British Indian Army's newly raised 7th Battalion in the 16th Punjab Regiment. Shortly afterwards, Malik rose through the ranks and was promoted to the rank of First Lieutenant during his time in 7/16th. He was later put to serve in an advisory capacity and appointed as the Brigade Intelligence Officer for the 114th Indian Infantry Brigade on 1 January 1942, and was subsequently promoted to the rank of Captain on 1 April 1942.

He would later go on to serve with his battalion in Burma and Malaya against the Imperial Japanese Armed Forces and supporting Axis powers; and by the end of the war in September 1945, was commanding "A" Company, 7/16th Punjab Regiment in Malaya as a temporary advisory Major.

Upon his return to India after the war, Malik continued his service in the British Indian Army as an officer. Over the next two years, the Indian independence movement against British colonial rule swelled, and by August 1947 had ultimately led to the partitioning of India into two separate states: the Hindu-majority Dominion of India and the Muslim-majority Dominion of Pakistan. After partition, Malik's regiment was allocated to the newly created Pakistan Army. He opted for Pakistani citizenship, and relocated across the new border shortly afterwards, transferring and continuing his military service with the Pakistan Army.

Personality 
Mailk was known amongst his peers for his towering presence, unsullied boldness in strategy, quick thinking, and patriotism. Although he was highly admired and respected by his subordinates, he would often be very outspoken towards them. As a tactician, he planned Operation Gibraltar and Operation Grand Slam under the auspices of the President of Pakistan: Field Marshal Ayub Khan.

Indo-Pakistani War of 1965 
As GOC for the 12th Infantry Division, Malik was the overall commander for Operation Grand Slam in the Second Kashmir War. For his successful handling of the initial phase of the operation, he was awarded the Hilal-i-Jur'at, the second highest gallantry award of the Pakistan Army.

Controversially, the command was unilaterally handed over to General Yahya Khan mid-operation, resulting in extensive delays, which were uncalled for, and eventual failure of the operation. The undisclosed reasons for this midway switch has made the operation an object of much speculation in Pakistan to this day.

It is alleged that the Pakistani President Ayub Khan knew that if Malik managed to wrest Kashmir from Indian control, he would become an undoubted and admired hero in the eyes of the Pakistani Public. General Yahya Khan and also the fact that he was a Ahmadi Muslim, the alleged favorite of Ayub Khan, was thus introduced midway by Ayub to foil any chances of the operation's success at the hands of Malik, who Ayub Khan saw as a political and military rival. In a letter to his brother, Lieutenant Gen. Abdul Ali Malik, Akhtar Malik bitterly highlighted the sudden change of command and inept leadership of General Yahya Khan as one of the main causes of failure.

Legacy 
Qudrat Ullah Shahab, an eminent Urdu writer and civil servant had also commented on the matter, saying:

Zulfikar Ali Bhutto, the ninth Prime Minister and fourth President had also commented on Ayub and Yahya's intervention in the war, saying:

Death 

After the war, Malik was posted to an advisory commanding position for CENTO in Ankara, Turkey, where he succumbed to injuries sustained in a road accident on 22 August 1969. His body was brought back to Pakistan and being an Ahmadi Muslim, he was buried in a dedicated cemetery in Rabwah.

Awards and decorations

Foreign decorations

References 

General Akhtar Hussain Malik, Daily Imroze, Lahore, 22 August 1971
From Plaebiscite to Partitions, Jammu-Kashmir.com, Oct 2004
Thanks, Indeed, Ghani Jafar, Daily Jang, 7 Jun, 2005

External links 
Read the para on 1965 war
Interviews by various Pakistani Generals who fought the 1965 war (in Urdu)
SURPRISE, SURPRISE

Year of birth missing
Pakistani generals
Recipients of Hilal-i-Jur'at
Pakistani Ahmadis
1969 deaths
British Indian Army officers
Indian Army personnel of World War II
Indian Military Academy alumni
Generals of the Indo-Pakistani War of 1965
Road incident deaths in Turkey
1910s births